Opsilia bucharica is a species of beetle from the family Cerambycidae found in Tajikistan and Uzbekistan.

References

Beetles described in 1943
Beetles of Asia
Opsilia
Insects of Central Asia